This is a list of New Zealand television events and premieres which occurred, or are scheduled to occur, in 1993, the 33rd year of continuous operation of television in New Zealand.

This is a list of New Zealand television-related events in 1993.

Events
24 January – TVNZ acquires 60 Minutes from TV3 with its first edition airing on Channel 2.
16 March – Channel 2 moves Thomas the Tank Engine & Friends to an early mourning slot on weekdays.
29 March – Long running New Zealand medical soap Shortland Street aired on ITV in Great Britain.
May - Channel 2 began broadcasting 24 hours on Friday and Saturday nights, running through to closedown on Sunday.
12 June – TV3 broadcast a 22-hour Telethon for the Starship Foundation.
18 June – The final episode of Sale of the Century aired on TV One.
10 July – An Australian-New Zealand-Canadian television series Deepwater Haven began on Channel 2.
19 July – Australian soap opera Paradise Beach arrived in New Zealand with the series airing on Channel 2.
Well known US talk show Sally Jessy Raphael aired in New Zealand for the very first time on TV One.
Various works from the TVNZ library had been purchased by British entertainment distribution company HIT Entertainment (well known for acquiring rights, producing and distributing children's television series such as Thomas and Friends, Pingu, Fireman Sam, Barney & Friends, The Wiggles, Angelina Ballerina and Bob the Builder).

Debuts

Domestic
10 July – Deepwater Haven (Channel 2) (also Australia and France) (1993)
Melody Rules (TV3) (1993–1995)
20/20 (TV3) (1993–2003, 2005–2014)

International
25 February – / Funnybones (Channel 2)
15 March – / The Adventures of Tintin (Channel 2)
20 April – / The Adventures of T-Rex (Channel 2)
4 May –  Men Behaving Badly (TV3)
10 May –  Batman: The Animated Series (Channel 2)
31 May –  The Young Indiana Jones Chronicles (TV3)
5 June – / Eek! The Cat (Channel 2)
10 June –  Full Frontal (Channel 2)
19 July –  Paradise Beach (Channel 2)
20 July –  G.B.H. (TV One)
18 August –  999 (TV One)
23 September –  Wild About Wheels (TV One)
28 September –  The Orchid House (TV One)
9 October –  X-Men (Channel 2)
11 October –  The Burden of Proof (Channel 2)
4 November –  Dr. Quinn, Medicine Woman (Channel 2)
8 November –  Billy (Channel 2)
28 November –  My Little Pony Tales (Channel 2)
11 December –  Biker Mice from Mars (Channel 2)
11 December – / Dog City (Channel 2)
13 December –  Juniper Jungle (Channel 2)
15 December –  The Hypnotic World of Paul McKenna (Channel 2)
 Code 3 (1992) (Channel 2)
 Sally Jesse Raphael (TV One)
 Wake, Rattle, and Roll (Channel 2)
 Grace & Favour (TV One)
 Barrymore (TV One)
 Eldorado (TV One)
 Sylvania Waters (TV One)
 The Adventures of Skippy (TV3)

Changes to network affiliation
This is a list of programs which made their premiere on a New Zealand television network that had previously premiered on another New Zealand television network. The networks involved in the switch of allegiances are predominantly both free-to-air networks or both subscription television networks. Programs that have their free-to-air/subscription television premiere, after previously premiering on the opposite platform (free-to air to subscription/subscription to free-to air) are not included. In some cases, programs may still air on the original television network. This occurs predominantly with programs shared between subscription television networks.

International

Subscription premieres
This is a list of programs which made their premiere on New Zealand subscription television that had previously premiered on New Zealand free-to-air television. Programs may still air on the original free-to-air television network.

International

Television shows
No information on television shows this year.

Ending this year
Sale of the Century (TV One) (1989–1993)